Aeoliscus is a genus of shrimpfishes found in the Indian and Pacific Oceans.

Species
There are currently two recognized extant species of Aeoliscus in this genus:
 Aeoliscus punctulatus (Bianconi, 1854) (speckled shrimpfish)
 Aeoliscus strigatus (Günther, 1861) (razorfish)

, Fossilworks recognizes an additional fossil species:
 Aeoliscus heinrichi

References

Centriscidae
Taxa named by David Starr Jordan
Taxa named by Edwin Chapin Starks
Marine fish genera